Hal Lister (1 May 192124 February 2010) was a British geographer and Arctic explorer. Hal was born Harold Lister in Keighley, West Yorkshire, and was educated at Keighley Grammar School and King's College (which later became Newcastle University). In 1948, Hal guided a small group of Newcastle University Geography undergraduates on a pioneering overseas expedition to Iceland. Hal joined the Merchant Navy, but transferred to the Royal Navy after learning to fly. He went to Fitzwilliam College, University of Cambridge in 1950 to do research in the Department of Geography, interrupted by his participation as a glaciologist in the British North Greenland Expedition, 1952–1954. His Ph.D. was awarded in 1956.  Hal was a glaciologist during the Commonwealth Trans-Antarctic Expedition, 1955-1958. During this expedition led by Sir Vivian Fuchs he helped to develop maps of the Weddell Sea. Hal's last post was as a reader at the School of Geography, Newcastle University. Hal formerly retired in 1986, but continued to travel widely and meet in academic circles until the last few years before he died on 24 February 2010. One of his later interests was Amnesty International.

Education
 Keighley Grammar School
 King's College (which later became Newcastle University)
 Fitzwilliam College, University of Cambridge

Scholarship
In academic circles Hal was perhaps best known for his glaciology and his exploration story telling. He was an active member of the International Glaciology Society for many years. Hal's enthusiasm for exploration was expressed in his involvement with the Young Explorers’ Trust, the British Schools Exploring Society, the Royal Geographical Society and the Brathay Exploration Society.

The Origin of Ice Marginal Terraces and Contact Ridges of East Kangerdluarssuk Glacier, SW Greenland
David Huddart and Hal Lister
Geografiska Annaler: Series A, Physical Geography, Vol. 63, No. 1/2 (1981), pp. 31–39
Published by: Wiley on behalf of the Swedish Society for Anthropology and Geography
Article Stable URL: https://www.jstor.org/stable/520562

References 

British geographers
Academics of Newcastle University
Alumni of Fitzwilliam College, Cambridge
Alumni of Newcastle University
Fellows of the Royal Geographical Society
1921 births
2010 deaths
Place of birth missing